Vemula Veeresham (born 1982) is an Indian politician from Telangana. He represented Nakrekal Assembly constituency. He belongs to Telangana Rashtra Samithi.

Early life
He was born to Vemula Kondaiah and Mallamma in Utukur village of Shali Gowraram Mandal Nalgonda district, Telangana, India and belongs to scheduled caste, Madiga community. He has completed his school education in Z.P.H.S. Madhavaram Kalan and his intermediate and degree in Nakrekal. Since his school education itself he actively participated in the student organization P.D.S.U.

Political career
Veeresham won from Nakrekal in 2014 Telangana Assembly Elections for the first time by defeating sitting MLA Chirumarthi Lingaiah. Being brought up from a poor backward family he knows the problems of the poor very well. Several development activities were initiated with the support of Minister for Energy, Telangana G. Jagadish Reddy.

He again contested as an MLA on Telangana Rashtra Samithi ticket in 2018 Assembly Elections. He was defeated by Chirumarthi Lingaiah of Indian National Congress.

Personal life
He is married to Pushpa Latha. They have a son, Vipul Kumar and a daughter, Vinuthna.

References

Living people
Telangana Rashtra Samithi politicians
Telangana MLAs 2014–2018
1982 births